Heat shock protein family D (Hsp60) member 1 pseudogene 2 is a protein that in humans is encoded by the HSPD1P2 gene.

References

Further reading 

Heat shock proteins